Mega Tbilisi is a Georgian basketball club based in Tbilisi. The team plays in the Georgian Superliga, since it was promoted in the 2020–21 season.

Honours
Georgian A-Liga
Champions (1): 2020–21

Notable players

 Deng Acuoth

References

External links
Mega Tbilisi at Eurobasket.com
Instagram profile

Basketball teams in Georgia (country)